Data plan refers to data quotas from a telecommunications or data hosting contract. Data plans are offered by internet service providers. These include mobile data plans, offered on cellular networks, from cellular telephony companies, and those from conventional fixed land line links, amongst other forms of offered data communications. Network data hosting servers also offer plans based on data served, such as for websites.

Reasons for data caps/plans 
Data plans are primarily designed by network carriers to limit the maximum amount of bandwidth offered for either cellular or cable services. This allows the network to facilitate more customers at a time while having less overall stress on its network. Cellular and satellite networks especially require these systems due to the high upfront costs of towers or satellite transmitters, costing up to three-hundred-fifty thousand dollars for one tower.

Cellular/satellite data plan formatting 
Data plans, sometimes also referred to as data caps, are usually created by a binding contract between the telecommunications carrier and the user of their service. This contract outlines a maximum amount of usable data, usually highlighted in either megabytes or gigabytes, allotted per month for the user. In most cases companies will allow a user to surpass the amount of data allowed in the contract, however, will have to pay a per-gigabyte fee, ranging anywhere from five to fifteen U.S. dollars.

Popularization of unlimited plans 
Unlimited data plans have seen a large increase in usage by consumers since their initial introduction by U.S. network T-Mobile. These plans, instead of setting an overall maximum for the user, have an amount set-up that, when surpassed, will slow the speed of the network for that user. Unlimited plans typically cost significantly more than the traditional shared data plans, which is a major reason that carriers have set large boundaries and fees. The limits imposed on unlimited plans are designed to fight against attempts to misuse the network, such as a DDoS attack, but are more commonly reasoned as a method to increase the number of people that can use one tower simultaneously.

Data speed changes 
When a network is near reaching peak capacity data speeds may be slowed down by carriers as part of most major telecomm contracts. This, as stated previously, allows for more people to be utilizing one tower, reducing needed capital for the company. Since speed changes are allowed at the company's will, the user has no official guarantee of speed on most major networks.

Costs brought upon by additional data 
In many cases both the user and carrier have to incur additional costs when a user utilizes more of a given data package, which has helped in the proliferation of data caps and other forms of shared data plans. Most of the charges that the carrier has to incur for additional data usage is partially or fully given to the user of the network.

Users 
Users are required to pay flat-rate additional fees that occur when they go above the amount of data given to them in their contract, utility, or prepaid plan. The cost per gigabyte of this fee is usually higher than what the contract itself offers, which discourages users from over-utilizing data and incurring a charge for the carrier. Certain contracts, which do not offer paying additional fees for an increase in data, may result in a shutdown of service, or in extremely rare cases, termination of the service as a whole.

Carriers 
Carriers incur costs for additional data usage, as it limits the number of customers, and associated contracts, that they can handle on one network. Creating more cell phone towers in a given area would be costly, and largely useless until particular spikes in traffic. When the peak usable amount of one tower is reached, it may cause negative public relations towards the reliability of the corporation as a whole.

Cable data plan formatting 
Traditional cable and fiber providers do not need to worry to the same degree about tower maintenance, as most of the costs of having additional bandwidth have been covered for years to come. Companies like Xfinity and AT&T regularly boast data caps in excess of one terabyte, which a majority of users will never use in the given period of a month. This opens a question about why the data cap exists in the first place, and it is usually found to be a method to deter large-scale denial-of-service attacks on their networks, and suppress business customers from utilizing personal internet connections.

Bundling 
Data caps are often associated with the allowed speeds of the network offered, as an attempt to associate two data restrictions together, which helps them to target market sectors easily. People who do not require fast data speeds usually do not need large data caps, and vice versa. This also creates the ability for corporations to up-sell customers on higher priced packages, similar to the operating methods of some cellular providers.

References 

Telecommunications